, son of regent Fusamichi with daughter of Ichijo Fuyuyoshi, was kugyō (court noble) of the Azuchi–Momoyama period (1568–1603) of Japan. He held a regent position kampaku from 1581 to 1585. He adopted Akiyoshi as his son.

References
 

1548 births
1611 deaths
Fujiwara clan
Ichijō family